The Wales National Pool is a 50-metre swimming pool in the Sketty area of Swansea, Wales.

The main pool is 50 m long and 21 m wide, so it does not meet the FINA definition of an Olympic size pool.

History
The £11 m pool opened in 2003 following the demolition of Wales' national pool, the Wales Empire Pool in Cardiff, in 1998 due to the construction of the Millennium Stadium, and served as its replacement for a short period, until the construction of the £32 m Cardiff International Pool.

Use
The facility, which also has a 25m x 9.5m training pool and 1,200 spectator seats, is one of the facilities used to train Wales' world class aquatic sports athletes and houses the headquarters of the Swim Wales, formerly the Wales Amateur Swimming Association.

Some swimmers used the pool to train for the London 2012 Olympics. The facility was built with funding from Sport Wales, Swansea Council and Swansea University and is built on the site of the university's sports centre.

See also
 List of Olympic-size swimming pools in the United Kingdom

Notes

External links
Wales National Pool (official site)
 Denbigh Dragons visit the National Pool (Denbigh Swimming Club)

Sports venues in Swansea
Swimming venues in Wales
Sports venues completed in 2003
Tourist attractions in Swansea
2003 establishments in Wales
University sports venues in the United Kingdom
University swimming in the United Kingdom